The Royal Oak-class ships of the line were a class of six 74-gun third rates, designed for the Royal Navy by Sir John Williams. The  were an enlarged version of the Royal Oak class.

Ships

Builder: Plymouth Dockyard
Ordered: 16 November 1765
Launched: 13 November 1769
Fate: Broken up, 1815

Builder: Plymouth Dockyard
Ordered: 12 October 1768
Laid Down: October 1769
Launched: 18 October 1773
Completed for Sea: 12 July 1777
Fate: Broken up, November 1794

Builder: Woolwich Dockyard
Ordered: 12 October 1768
Launched: 27 October 1775
Fate: Broken up, 1817

Builder: Adams, Deptford
Ordered: 14 January 1771
Launched: 27 May 1774
Fate: Broken up, 1816

Builder: Randall, Rotherhithe
Ordered: 14 January 1771
Launched: 25 June 1774
Fate: Broken up, 1816

Builder: Barnard, Harwich
Ordered: 14 January 1771
Launched: 23 December 1775
Fate: Broken up, 1816

References

Lavery, Brian (2003) The Ship of the Line - Volume 1: The development of the battlefleet 1650–1850. Conway Maritime Press. .
 Winfield, Rif. British Warships of the Age of Sail 1714-1792: Design, Construction, Careers and Fates, pub Seaforth, 2007, 

 
Ship of the line classes